, born , was the wife of Emperor Taishō and the mother of Emperor Shōwa of Japan. Her posthumous name, Teimei, means "enlightened constancy".

Biography
Sadako Kujō was born on 25 June 1884 in Tokyo, as the fourth daughter of Duke Michitaka Kujō, head of Kujō branch of the Fujiwara clan. Her mother was Ikuko Noma.

She married then-Crown Prince Yoshihito (the future Emperor Taishō) on 10 May 1900, at the age of 15. The couple lived in the newly constructed Akasaka Palace in Tokyo, outside of the main Tokyo Imperial Palace complex. When she gave birth to a son, Prince Hirohito (the future Emperor Shōwa) in 1901, she was the first official wife of a Crown Prince or Emperor to have given birth to the official heir to the throne since 1750.

She became empress consort (kōgō) when her husband ascended to the throne on 30 July 1912. Given her husband's weak physical and mental condition, she exerted a strong influence on imperial life, and was an active patron of Japanese Red Cross Society. The relations between the Emperor and Empress were very good, as evidenced by Emperor Taishō's lack of interest in taking concubines, thus breaking with hundreds of years of imperial tradition, and by her giving birth to four sons.

She openly objected to Japan's involvement in World War II, which might have caused conflict with her son, Hirohito. From 1943, she also worked behind the scenes with her third son Prince Takamatsu to bring about the downfall of Prime Minister Hideki Tōjō.

She was a Buddhist adherent who had the faith of the Lotus Sutra and prayed with the Shinto ritual ceremonies of the Tokyo Imperial Palace.

She died on 17 May 1951 at Omiya Palace in Tokyo, aged 66, and was buried near her husband, Emperor Taishō, in the Tama no higashi no misasagi (多摩東陵) at the Musashi Imperial Graveyard in Tokyo.

Honours

National
 Grand Cordon of the Order of Meiji
 Grand Cordon of the Order of the Precious Crown

Foreign 
 : The 1,060th Dame of the Royal Order of Queen Maria Luisa

Issue

Ancestry

Gallery

See also
 Japanese empresses
 Ōmiya Palace

Notes

References
 Bix, Herbert P. (2000). Hirohito and the Making of Modern Japan. New York: HarperCollins. ; 
 Fujitani, Takashi. (1998). Splendid Monarchy: Power and Pageantry in Modern Japan.. Berkeley: University of California Press. ; —Reprint edition, 1998. 
 Hoyt, Edwin P. (1992). Hirohito: The Emperor and the Man. New York: Praeger Publishers. ; 

1884 births
1951 deaths
People from Tokyo
Japanese empresses
Kujō family
Fujiwara clan
Emperor Taishō

Grand Cordons (Imperial Family) of the Order of the Precious Crown
Recipients of the Order of the Sacred Treasure, 1st class